Gnorimoschema herbichii is a moth in the family Gelechiidae. It was described by Nowicki in 1864. It is found in Portugal, Spain, France, the Netherlands, Germany, Denmark, Poland, Hungary, Romania, North Macedonia, the Baltic region, Norway, Finland, Ukraine and Russia. In the east, the range extends to Transbaikalia, Mongolia and Kamchatka. It is also found in North America, where it has been recorded from Alberta, Yukon, Manitoba and Ontario.

The wingspan is 14–15 mm.

The larvae feed on Equisetum arvense, Equisetum palustre, Suaeda maritima and Atriplex species.

References

Gnorimoschema
Moths described in 1864